Randy Rustenberg (born 4 February 1984) is a Dutch professional footballer who plays as a defender.

Career
Born in Amsterdam, Rustenberg has played for RKC Waalwijk, FC Dordrecht, SC Cambuur, AGOVV Apeldoorn, FC Emmen and Pattaya United.

References

External links
voetbal international profile

1984 births
Living people
Dutch footballers
Footballers from Amsterdam
RKC Waalwijk players
FC Dordrecht players
SC Cambuur players
AGOVV Apeldoorn players
FC Emmen players
Randy Rustenberg
Eredivisie players
Eerste Divisie players
Dutch expatriate footballers
Expatriate footballers in Thailand
Association football defenders